Clydevale is a township on the banks of the Clutha River / Mata-Au, in the Clutha Valley, 29 kilometres north-west of Balclutha.

The township was established by the New Zealand and Australian Land Company in the 1860s. The company officially named the township in 1863, after the River Clyde in Scotland.

French food company Danone operates milk factory at Clydevale, which produces toddler infant formula brand Karicare. A new biomass boiler plant was installed between 2019 and 2021.

The settlement has a war memorial with the statue of a soldier, and a plaque listing local men who died in World War I and World War II.

Demographics

Clutha Valley had a population of 1,608 at the 2018 New Zealand census, an increase of 84 people (5.5%) since the 2013 census, and an increase of 48 people (3.1%) since the 2006 census. There were 570 households. There were 879 males and 729 females, giving a sex ratio of 1.21 males per female. The median age was 36.4 years (compared with 37.4 years nationally), with 375 people (23.3%) aged under 15 years, 306 (19.0%) aged 15 to 29, 762 (47.4%) aged 30 to 64, and 165 (10.3%) aged 65 or older.

Ethnicities were 84.1% European/Pākehā, 9.1% Māori, 1.9% Pacific peoples, 8.0% Asian, and 3.7% other ethnicities (totals add to more than 100% since people could identify with multiple ethnicities).

The proportion of people born overseas was 14.7%, compared with 27.1% nationally.

Although some people objected to giving their religion, 51.3% had no religion, 39.6% were Christian, 0.2% were Hindu, 0.9% were Buddhist and 1.3% had other religions.

Of those at least 15 years old, 183 (14.8%) people had a bachelor or higher degree, and 216 (17.5%) people had no formal qualifications. The median income was $40,100, compared with $31,800 nationally. 207 people (16.8%) earned over $70,000 compared to 17.2% nationally. The employment status of those at least 15 was that 795 (64.5%) people were employed full-time, 204 (16.5%) were part-time, and 30 (2.4%) were unemployed.

Education
Clutha Valley School is a full primary school serving years 1 to 8 with a roll of  students as of 

Clutha Valley District High School opened in 1939 as the amalgamation of eight small schools, and two other schools merged with it in the 1940s. It became a primary school in 1967. Clutha Valley Primary School opened as a replacement in Clydesdale in 2008. In 2019, plans were announced to demolish the existing school buildings, and rebuild the entire school from scratch.

References

Populated places in Otago
Clutha District